Ben Moore may refer to:

 Ben Moore (judge) (1891–1958), U.S. federal judge
 Ben Moore (composer) (born 1960), U.S. composer
 Ben Moore (astrophysicist) (born 1966), U.K. astrophysicist and musician
 Ben Moore (footballer) (born 1977), Australian rules footballer
 Ben Moore (curator) (born 1978), British art curator, entrepreneur, and artist
 Ben Moore (snowboarder) (born 1986), U.K. snowboarder
 Ben Moore (basketball) (born 1995), U.S. basketball player
 Ben Moore (1941–2022), U.S. soul singer who performed under the name Bobby Purify
 Ben Moore (Chaos Walking), fictional characters

See also
Benjamin Moore (disambiguation)
Ben Moor (disambiguation)
Ben More (disambiguation)